Geunyoung Industry Co, Ltd. (hangul:근영산업) is a Korean auto parts company headquartered in Nowon-Dong, Buk-Gu Daegu established in 1977. It makes automotive spare parts products, similar to Hyundai Mobis and SL Corp. The "Geunyoung Industry" CEO is brother by Yoo Deok Sool & Yoo Yeong Sool (유덕술, 유영술 형제).

Group families
Geunyoung Industry Co, Ltd.
Geunyoung Tech Co, Ltd.
Geunyoung Precision Co, Ltd.

History
1977: Geunyoung Industry Co, Ltd. (Nowon-Dong Buk-Gu Daegu) was founded
1980: Expanded and moved (Chimsan 1-gu) 
1988: Approved to be auto joint enterprise in Ssangyong Motor Company 
1989: Introduce Quality Control
1990: Introduce KS mark
1991: Set up 2 Rubber Injection in automation
1993: Build laboratory, install machinery and tools companion open
2000: Expanded and moved (Nowon 3-ga) 
2003: Source by Korea company

See also
Economy of South Korea
Auto parts
Automotive

References

External links
Geunyeong Industry Homepage (in Korean & English)

Companies based in Daegu
Auto parts suppliers of South Korea
Automotive companies established in 1977
South Korean companies established in 1977